Lafave or LaFave is a surname. Notable people with the surname include:

 Robert Lafave (born 1927), American, WWII Veteran, Home Builder
 Jimmy LaFave (born 1955), American singer-songwriter
 Beau LaFave (born 1992), member of the Michigan House of Representatives (108th district)